The following is a list of MTV Pilipinas winners for Video of the Year.

References

MTV Pilipinas Music Awards